The Sadiqabad railway accident occurred on 11 July 2019 in Rahim Yar Khan District, Punjab, Pakistan. The Quetta-bound Akbar Express collided with a cargo rake at Walhar railway station (parked at the passing loop), due to improper handling of the track switching mechanism.

Relief operations were launched immediately and a medical emergency was declared at nearby hospitals. An inquiry has been ordered and proportionate compensation for the victims were announced by the railway ministry. Whilst the unaffected coaches of the train left for its destination, regular traffic along the stretch of ML1 route was since suspended. 

President Arif Alvi, Prime Minister Imran Khan and other political leaders offered their condolences; the opposition noted such accidents to be a recurring event in the recent past and sought for the resignation of the incumbent Rail Minister Sheikh Rasheed Ahmad. 

The death toll was listed as being 24 people, all of whom were on the passenger train.

References

2019 disasters in Pakistan
2019 in Punjab, Pakistan
Disasters in Punjab, Pakistan
Rahim Yar Khan District
Railway accidents in 2019
Train collisions in Pakistan